Ivonne Z. Jiménez Velázquez is a Puerto Rican geriatrician and internist. She is a professor and chair of the department of medicine at University of Puerto Rico School of Medicine.

Early life and education 
Jiménez Velázquez was born in San Juan, Puerto Rico. She completed a bachelor's degree, magna cum laude, at University of Puerto Rico in 1978. She earned a medical degree from University of Puerto Rico School of Medicine in 1982. She interned at Hospital Regional de Caguas and for 3 years in internal medicine at Hospital Universitario where she later became an instructor in the department of medicine. Jiménez Velázquez specialized in geriatrics at Mount Sinai Hospital until 1989.

Career 
Jiménez Velázquez worked as an adjunct professor at Mount Sinai before returning to the department of medicine at University of Puerto Rico School of Medicine where she became a full professor in 2002. She is chair of the department of medicine. She is a member of the American Geriatrics Society, Association of Professors of Medicine, and American Association for Geriatric Psychiatry.

Awards and honors 
Jiménez Velázquez is a fellow of the American College of Physicians.

References

External links
  Ivonne Jiménez Velázquez

Living people
Year of birth missing (living people)
People from San Juan, Puerto Rico
University of Puerto Rico School of Medicine alumni
University of Puerto Rico faculty
American geriatricians
Women geriatricians
American internists
Puerto Rican geriatricians
Puerto Rican women physicians
20th-century American physicians
21st-century American physicians
20th-century American women physicians
21st-century American women physicians
American women academics